Calcium channel, voltage-dependent, gamma subunit 2, also known as CACNG2 or stargazin is a protein that in humans is encoded by the CACNG2 gene.

Function 
L-type calcium channels are composed of five subunits. The protein encoded by this gene represents one of these subunits, gamma, and is one of several gamma subunit proteins. It is an integral membrane protein that is thought to stabilize the calcium channel in an inactive (closed) state. This protein is similar to the mouse stargazin protein, mutations in which having been associated with absence seizures, also known as petit-mal or spike-wave seizures. This gene is a member of the neuronal calcium channel gamma subunit gene subfamily of the PMP-22/EMP/MP20 family.

Stargazin is involved in the transportation of AMPA receptors to the synaptic membrane, and the regulation of their receptor rate constants — via its extracellular domain — once it is there. As it is highly expressed throughout the cerebral cortex, it is likely to have an important role in learning within these areas, due to the importance of AMPA receptors in LTP.

Clinical significance 

Disruptions of CACNG2 have been implicated in autism.

Interactions 

CACNG2 has been shown to interact with GRIA4, DLG4, and MAGI2.

See also 
 Voltage-dependent calcium channel

References

Further reading

External links 
 
 
 

Ion channels